Alyvia Alyn Lind (born July 27, 2007) is an American actress. She played the roles of Faith Newman on the CBS daytime soap opera The Young and the Restless from 2011 to 2021, 9-year-old Dolly Parton in the made-for-television movies Dolly Parton's Coat of Many Colors and Dolly Parton's Christmas of Many Colors: Circle of Love, and Angelica Green in the 2019 Netflix series Daybreak. She stars as Lexy Cross in the 2021 TV series Chucky.

Career
Lind made her feature film debut in 2013 in the film Dark Skies. From 2011 to early 2021 she played Faith Newman in the television daytime soap opera  The Young and the Restless. She has had recurring roles in the television series Revenge as young Amanda Clarke, as well as in Transparent as Grace. She guest starred on such series as NCIS and Masters of Sex. In 2014, she appeared in the feature movie Blended.

In 2016, Lind starred in the Amazon Studios special An American Girl Story – Maryellen 1955: Extraordinary Christmas, playing the role of American Girl character Maryellen Larkin.

Lind was cast in the main role of Angelica Green in the Netflix comedy-drama series Daybreak.

Beginning in 2021, Lind appeared on Chucky starring as Lexy Cross.

Personal life
Lind is the youngest daughter of actress Barbara Alyn Woods and producer John Lind. She has two older sisters, Natalie Alyn Lind and Emily Alyn Lind, who are also actresses.

Filmography

Awards and nominations

References

External links

21st-century American actresses
American child actresses
American film actresses
American television actresses
Living people
Place of birth missing (living people)
American soap opera actresses
2007 births